Jack Black (born 1969) is an American actor and singer from Tenacious D.

Jack Black may also refer to:

 Jack Black (author) (1871–1932), author and hobo
 Jack Black (rat catcher), Victorian-era rat catcher
 Jack Black (Viz), a character in the adult comic Viz
 Jack Black (died 1786), nickname of black Welsh gardener John Ystumllyn

See also

 John Black (disambiguation)
 Black Jack (disambiguation)
 
 Black (disambiguation)
 Jack (disambiguation)